Peter G. Miller is an American journalist and author. Also  known as Peter Miller, he is a newspaper columnist nationally syndicated by Content That Works.

Early life 

Miller was born in Manhattan. He was raised in his early years in Manhattan and on a farm in Brewster, NY. The family later moved to northern New Jersey.

Miller as a teenager worked during the summers at Camp Reinberg in Palatine, IL and the Herald Tribune Fresh Air Fund camp in Milan, NY (The Herald Tribune Fresh Air Fund was later supported by The New York Times. It is known now as the Fresh Air Fund).

Both camps were designed to provide outdoor experiences for children who lived in major cities. Tribune Lane in Milan, NY—near Rhinebeck—remains as evidence of where the former Herald Tribune camp was located. Camp Reinberg is now a part of the Forest Preserves of Cook County.

While in high school Miller wrote letters to major New York City newspapers, a number of which were published. This led to an interest in journalism and public affairs.

Education 

Miller is a graduate of the American University in Washington, DC. He holds a BA in journalism, an MS in public relations, and a Graduate Certificate of Government Public Information.

Military service 

Miller enlisted in the Army National Guard as a college sophomore. His unit was federalized during the Vietnam War era, however the unit did not serve overseas.

Personal life 

Miller has been married to Caroline (Harrison Tucker) Miller for more than 35 years. They have two children: Sam and Amanda.

Professional Background 

During his career Miller has been:

 An accredited correspondent on Capitol Hill,
 A member of the White House Correspondents Association,
 A member of the National Press Club, 
 A Washington editor with The Chilton Company, a major publisher of business magazines,
 A weekly columnist with The Washington Post.

Making Newsman's Privilege a National Right 

Doctors, lawyers, and clerics all have a protected right to interact in private with patients, clients, and congregants. In "Newsman's Privilege: An Issue of Press Freedom,” Miller found that journalists often had little if any way to protect sources at the state level. The article called for the establishment of a federal newsman's privilege act that would protect reporters in all states. Miller's piece was published by The Quill (July 1971), the national magazine of Sigma Delta Chi, what is now known as the Society of Professional Journalists (SPJ).

Who Uses the Freedom of Information Act (FOIA)? 

Miller's early study of the Freedom of Information Act (FOIA) found that it helped journalists informally pressure federal agencies to provide information. However, some four years after the 1967 passage of the legislation, formal FOIA appeals by journalists were rare. Miller's study showed that of 133 formal FOIA requests just 12 came from the media while most came from private attorneys and business interests. From Freedom of Information Act: Boon or Bust for the Press?, Editor & Publisher, July 8, 1972.

Putting Real Estate Online 

Miller was the original creator and host of the Real Estate Desk at America Online, one of the Internet's earliest and largest real estate hubs. "For the most part," reported Inman News in 1996, "he is credited with legitimizing the on-line real estate world."

Forecasting the Mortgage Meltdown 

Miller was an early critic of the financial practices and products which lead to the mortgage meltdown. In a speech before the Association of Real Estate License Law Officials in Jacksonville on April 7, 2006, he told the nation's real estate regulators:

"If you look at the numbers you can see that for many buyers the pricing gamble has been a huge success during the past few years. Home values have risen substantially in most areas. The odds are overwhelming that if you bought in 2000 or before and sold in 2005 or thereabouts you made money. A lot of money.

"But looming in the background is the potential for financial disaster that will impact home values nationwide, spur foreclosure rates to new highs and devalue insurance funds, pension holdings and investor accounts. The value of your home, no matter how you financed, is at stake."

Published Books 

Miller is the author of seven books published originally by Harper & Row, including one with a co-author.

 The Common-Sense Mortgage: How to Cut the Cost of Home Ownership by $100,000 or More
 Successful Real Estate Investing: A Practical Guide to Profits for the Small Investor 
 The Common-Sense Guide to Successful Real Estate Negotiation: How Buyers, Sellers and Brokers Can Get Their Share–And More–At the Bargaining Table (written with attorney Douglas M. Bregman) 
 Buy Your First Home Now 
 How to Sell Your Home in Any Market — With or Without a Broker 
 Inside The Real Estate Deal 
 Media Marketing: How to Get Your Name & Story in Print & on the Air

External links 

Attom Data Solutions
Bankrate.com
Content That Works (Syndicated Newspaper Column)
HuffingtonPost.com
Muckrack.com
OurBroker.com (Personal Site)
RealtyTimes.com
RealtyTrac.com
ReFiGuide.org
Ten-x.com
TheMortgageReports.com
TheSimpleDollar.com
TheStreet.com
Think Realty

References 

American male journalists
American journalists
American University School of Communication alumni
Living people
Year of birth missing (living people)
People from Manhattan